This is a bibliography of works on the Philippines.

Overviews

History

Culture

Economy

Politics

Demographics

See also

Outline of the Philippines

Philippines